Chipola College is a public college in Marianna, Florida. It is part of the Florida College System.

History 
The school was founded in 1947 as Chipola Junior College; its name was changed in 2003 after the college developed several bachelor's degree programs.

Campus 
The college was named for the Chipola River, which is located less than a mile from the campus. In 2012, the school opened a $16 million, 56,000 square foot center for the arts, including two theaters.

Academics 
The college offers degree programs leading to the award of Associate of Arts and Associate of Science degrees, as well as Bachelor of Science degrees in Business, Education, and Nursing.

Student life 
The Brain Bowl team has won nine state championships and three national championships under coach Stan Young and assistant coach Robert Dunkle.

Sports 
The school is noted for its athletic program, which competes in the Panhandle Conference of the Florida State College Activities Association, a body of the National Junior College Athletic Association Region 8.

Baseball

The baseball program counts among its alumni former Texas Rangers manager Buck Showalter and World Baseball Classic standout Adam Loewen, Milwaukee Brewers third baseman Mat Gamel, Toronto Blue Jays outfielder José Bautista, and Los Angeles Dodgers catcher Russell Martin.

Basketball

The men's basketball program was once home to Auburn standout Chris Porter, Oklahoma State player Mario Boggan, Arkansas' Jesse Pate, Missouri's Stefhon Hannah, and Indiana's JaMarcus Ellis and DeAndre Thomas.

The men's basketball program has won more state basketball championships under one coach (seven for Milton H. Johnson) and in total (nine) than any other junior-college basketball program in Florida. In the 2003–2004 and 2004–05 seasons, it finished fifth and third in the nation respectively and, in 2005, received its first-ever No. 1 national ranking. 

In 2004–2005, the basketball program won state championships in both men's and women's basketball.  The women's basketball team repeated its state championship in 2005–2006, finishing fourth in the nation. In 2006–2007, the men's and women's teams both won the state championship. 

To finish the 2007 season, the men's program finished 33–3 with a runner-up finish in the NJCAA National Championship game. During that season, the Indians were ranked #1 in the national poll for 10 straight weeks.

Notable alumni

References

External links

 
Education in Jackson County, Florida
Educational institutions established in 1947
Florida College System
Universities and colleges accredited by the Southern Association of Colleges and Schools
1947 establishments in Florida
NJCAA athletics